La Guerre des boutons or War of the Buttons is a 1962 French film directed by Yves Robert. War of the Buttons is about two rival kid gangs whose playful combats escalate into violence. The title derives from the buttons that are cut off from the rival team's clothes as combat trophies. The film is based on La Guerre des boutons, a novel by Louis Pergaud (1882–1915), who was killed in action in World War I and whose works portray a fervent anti-militarism.

The young and largely untrained actors included André Treton ("Lebrac"), Michel Isella ("l'Aztec") and Martin Lartigue ("Petit Gibus").  The character Petit Gibus's line of dialogue - uttered in frustration - "si j'aurais su, j'aurais pas v'nu" ("if I woulda known, I wouldn'ta come"), with its incorrect grammar (the correct form should be: "si javais su, je ne serais pas venu") has become a familiar tagline in France (the line was not in the original novel).

The film won France's Prix Jean Vigo.

The film was remade in Ireland in 1994 as War of the Buttons, in an Irish setting, and again in France in 2011, with the original title.

Cast
 Jacques Dufilho - L'Aztec's father
 Yvette Etiévant - Lebrac's mother
 Michel Galabru - Bacaillé's father
 Michèle Méritz - L'Aztec's mother
 Jean Richard - Lebrac's father
 Pierre Tchernia - Bédouin
 Pierre Trabaud - School teacher
 Claude Confortès - Nestor the postman
 Paul Crauchet - Touegueule
 Henri Labussière - A countryman
 Yves Peneau - The prefect
 Robert Rollis - Migue la lune's father
 Louisette Rousseau - Bacaillé's mother
 Christophe Bourseiller - Gaston
 Claude Bourseiller		
 Tsilla Chelton		
 François Boyer - The priest (uncredited)
 Marie-Catherine Faburel - Marie-Tintin (uncredited)
 Michel Isella - L'Aztec (uncredited)
 François Lartigue - Grand Gibus (uncredited)
 Martin Lartigue - Petit Gibus (uncredited)
 André Treton - Lebrac (uncredited)
 Claude Meunier - Bacaillé

References

External links

1962 films
French adventure films
Films based on French novels
Films directed by Yves Robert
1960s French films